The Eastern Intercollegiate Volleyball Association (EIVA) is a college athletic conference whose member schools compete in men's volleyball. Its member institutions are located in the Northeast United States.

The EIVA Tournament champion receives one of five automatic bids to the NCAA National Collegiate Men's Volleyball Championship.  The other four automatic bids go to the two other traditional major volleyball conferences, the MIVA (Midwestern Intercollegiate Volleyball Association) and the MPSF (Mountain Pacific Sports Federation); the Big West Conference, which in the 2017–18 school year became the first Division I all-sports conference ever to sponsor men's volleyball; and Conference Carolinas, a Division II conference that was the first all-sports conference in either Division I or II to sponsor men's volleyball. Before the 2014 tournament, the EIVA, MIVA, and MPSF received three of the four bids to the NCAA tournament, with the remaining entry being an at-large bid that was chosen from one of the three leagues by a committee of coaches from these leagues. The tournament expanded to six teams in 2014 when Conference Carolinas was given its automatic bid, and seven in 2018 with the addition of the Big West champion. The current lineup consists of the five conference champions and two at-large entries.

Penn State won every conference championship from 1991 through 2017, with the exception of 1998 when Princeton captured the title and 2016 when George Mason won the title. Harvard and Princeton emerged on top in 2018 and 2019, respectively. The Nittany Lions are the only conference team to win the NCAA national championships, having captured the title in 1994 and 2008.

As of the current 2023 season (2022–23 school year), the EIVA consists of six schools: the University of Charleston (in West Virginia; not to be confused with the College of Charleston in South Carolina), George Mason University, Harvard University, the New Jersey Institute of Technology (NJIT), Pennsylvania State University (Penn State or PSU) and Princeton University. All are Division I members except for D-II Charleston. The top four teams compete for the EIVA championship.  The winner represents the conference in the NCAA Div. I/II national championships.

The most recent change to the EIVA membership came after the 2022 season. Sacred Heart University, St. Francis College (known athletically as St. Francis Brooklyn, from its New York City location), and Saint Francis University (in Pennsylvania) left to join the new men's volleyball league of their full-time home of the Northeast Conference (NEC). This left the EIVA with six members, the minimum needed to maintain its automatic NCAA tournament berth.

Previously, from 2005-2006 to 2010-2011, the conference was divided into two divisions.  The higher division was named the Tait Division and the lower division was named the Hay Division.  The conference used a system of promotion and relegation whereby the last place team from the Tait Division went to the Hay for the following season and the highest ranked Hay Division team moved to the Tait. Prior to that, there was a second lower division (equal to Hay) named the Sweeney Division, but this was eliminated for the 2006 season.  The two lower divisions were merged into one division at that time.

On April 28, 2012, Uvaldo Acosta (George Mason), Tom Hay (Springfield College), Ivan Marquez (Concordia [NY]), Bill Odeneal (SUNY New Paltz), Bob Sweeney (East Stroudsburg), and Tom Tait (Penn State) were inducted into the EIVA's inaugural Hall of Fame class during the 2012 EIVA Championship match at Penn State.

Members
As of the 2022–23 school year, the EIVA has six member teams, five from the NCAA's Division I. The University of Charleston of Division II joined the conference for competition in 2016 after spending the 2015 season as an independent. The most recent change in membership was the departure of the three NEC members for their conference's new men's volleyball league; one of the three, St. Francis Brooklyn, had joined the EIVA only a year earlier.

Through the 2014 season, Division III Rutgers–Newark had been the EIVA's eighth member but spent its final years in the EIVA transitioning to Division III men's volleyball and left for the D-III Continental Volleyball Conference in 2015. Because Rutgers–Newark traditionally competed in the former University Division in men's volleyball before the NCAA created its current three-division setup in 1972, it had been allowed to award scholarships in that sport, making it one of only seven D-III schools then allowed to do so in any sport. As part of its D-III transition, it stopped awarding scholarships to new athletes in the 2011 season.

Conference arenas

Former members

References

External links
 Official Website of the Eastern Intercollegiate Volleyball Association
 AVCA - American Volleyball Coaches Association - Men's Volleyball

 
NCAA conferences